The First Baptist Church in Trinidad, Colorado is a historic church at 809 San Pedro Street.  It was built in 1890 and was added to the National Register of Historic Places in 2000.

It is a "Romanesque-inspired" building with a T-shaped plan, built of local buff-colored sandstone upon a concrete foundation.

It was designed by Trinidad architects Charles W. Bulger and Isaac Hamilton Rapp, and is perhaps just their second commission when they were in partnership.

References

Baptist churches in Colorado
Churches on the National Register of Historic Places in Colorado
Romanesque Revival church buildings in Colorado
Churches completed in 1890
Churches in Las Animas County, Colorado
National Register of Historic Places in Las Animas County, Colorado